Robert Large (died 1441) was a London merchant, a member of the Worshipful Company of Mercers, who was Mayor of London and a Member of Parliament.

He was served as one of the Mercers' four yearly wardens in 1427 and was Sheriff of London in 1430-31. In 1437/8, he was the wealthy master to whom the young William Caxton was apprenticed. He was Member of Parliament in 1435 for the City of London as one of the two aldermanic representatives and was elected Lord Mayor in 1439-40.

He died in 1441, and his will was proved in the Prerogative Court of Canterbury.

The publication of a 100-page book about him entitled The Life and Family of Robert Large, mercer: mayor of London 1439-1440 and first employer of William Caxton by David Large was announced in Genealogists' Magazine, journal of the Society of Genealogists, London, volume 29, number 7, September 2008, and was issued by the Foundation for Medieval Genealogy, Oak House, Vowchurch, Hereford HR2 0RB, England.

See also
 List of Sheriffs of the City of London
 List of Lord Mayors of London 
 City of London (elections to the Parliament of England)

References

External links
http://www.bl.uk/treasures/caxton/merchant.html (Caxton and Large)
http://www.british-history.ac.uk/report.aspx?compid=45561 (Mayors and Sheriffs of London)

Year of birth unknown
1441 deaths
Sheriffs of the City of London
English MPs 1435
Members of the Parliament of England for the City of London
15th-century lord mayors of London
15th-century English businesspeople